Shawn Colvin (born Shawna Lee Colvin, January 10, 1956) is an American singer-songwriter and musician. While Colvin has been a solo recording artist for decades, she is best known for her 1998 Grammy Award-winning song "Sunny Came Home".

Early life
Colvin was born Shawna Lee Colvin in Vermillion, South Dakota, and spent her youth in Carbondale, Illinois, and London, Ontario, Canada. She is the second of four children. She learned to play guitar at the age of 10 and grew up listening to her father's collection of music, which included artists such as Pete Seeger and the Kingston Trio.

Career
Her first paid gig came just after she started college at Southern Illinois University. Colvin performed at local venues in Carbondale and later formed a band. For six months, they expanded their fanbase throughout Illinois. During this time, Colvin struggled with drug and alcohol use. She later formed Dixie Diesels, a country-swing group. Colvin relocated to Austin, Texas, with the group and then entered "the folk circuit in and around Berkeley, California, before straining her vocal cords and taking a sabbatical at the age of 24.

Colvin relocated to New York City, joining the Buddy Miller Band in 1980 and later became involved in the Fast Folk cooperative of Greenwich Village.

While participating in off-Broadway shows such as Pump Boys and Dinettes she was featured in Fast Folk magazine, and in 1987, producer Steve Addabbo hired her to sing backup vocals on the song "Luka" by Suzanne Vega.

After touring with Vega, Colvin signed a recording contract with Columbia Records and released her debut album Steady On in 1989. The album won a Grammy Award for Best Contemporary Folk Album. Colvin's second album Fat City was released in 1992 and received a Grammy nomination for Best Contemporary Folk Recording. Her song "I Don't Know Why" was nominated for a Grammy in the Best Female Pop Vocal category. In 1993, she moved back to Austin and, in 1994, released the album Cover Girl. In 1995, Colvin released her album Live 88 a collection of live recordings from 1988.

In 1996, Colvin released her album A Few Small Repairs and, in 1997, her single "Sunny Came Home" spent four weeks at the number one spot on the Adult Contemporary chart. The song won the 1998 Grammy Awards for both Song and Record of the Year. Colvin released the album Holiday Songs and Lullabies in 1998 and in 2001 released another album called Whole New You. In 2004, she released a compilation of past songs called, Polaroids: A Greatest Hits Collection.

In 2006, Colvin left Columbia Records and released a 15-song album called These Four Walls on her new label, Nonesuch Records, which featured contributions by Patty Griffin and Teddy Thompson. In 2009 she released Live, which was recorded at the jazz club Yoshi's in Oakland, California.

Colvin's eighth studio album, All Fall Down, was released in 2012 and was produced by Buddy Miller at his home studio in Nashville, Tennessee. The album featured guest appearances by Emmylou Harris, Alison Krauss and Jakob Dylan. Colvin published her memoir Diamond in the Rough in 2012. In 2016 she recorded an album with Steve Earle called Colvin and Earle. A Few Small Repairs was reissued in 2017, including its first pressing on vinyl, for its 20th anniversary.

Colvin has made vocal contributions to songs by James Taylor, Béla Fleck, Edwin McCain, Shawn Mullins, Elliott Murphy and Bruce Hornsby, and collaborated with Sting on the song "One Day She'll Love Me". She recorded as a duet the title track to Curtis Stigers' 1995 album "Time Was". Colvin voiced Rachel Jordan, Ned Flanders' love interest after Maude is killed, in the Simpsons episode "Alone Again, Natura-Diddily" on February 13, 2000, and lent her vocals to Mary Chapin Carpenter's 1992 recordings "The Hard Way" and "Come On Come On".

Personal life
Colvin has been married twice, first to Simon Tassano in 1993 whom she divorced in 1995, and to photographer Mario Erwin, whom she married in 1997 and divorced in 2002. She gave birth to daughter, Caledonia, in July 1998.

Colvin has taken part in several triathlons.

Colvin says she has struggled on and off with depression, alcoholism, and anxiety. She wrote about these struggles in her 2012 memoir Diamond in the Rough, published by HarperCollins.

Awards and recognition

Grammy Awards

Other awards 
{| class=wikitable
|-
! Year !! Awards !! Category !! Work !! Result
|-
| rowspan=2|1997
| Billboard Music Video Awards
| FAN.tastic Video
| rowspan="5"|"Sunny Came Home"
| 
|-
| Billboard Music Awards
| Top Adult Top 40 Track
| 
|-
| rowspan=2|1998
| APRA Music Awards
| Most Performed Foreign Work
| 
|-
| MVPA Awards
| Best Adult Contemporary Video
| 
|-
| 1999
| ASCAP Pop Music Awards
| Most Performed Song 
| 
|-
| 2001
| Video Premiere Awards 
| Best Original Song 
| "Great Big World"
| 
|-
| 2016
| Americana Music Honors & Awards 
| Americana Trailblazer Award
| Herself 
|

Discography

Albums 
 Steady On (1989)
 Fat City (1992)
 Cover Girl (1994)
 A Few Small Repairs (1996)
 Holiday Songs and Lullabies (1998)
 Whole New You (2001)
 These Four Walls (2006)
 All Fall Down (2012)
 Uncovered (2015)
 Colvin & Earle (2016, with Steve Earle)
 The Starlighter (2018)
Steady On: 30th Anniversary Acoustic Edition (2019)

Compilation albums
 Polaroids: A Greatest Hits Collection (2004)
 The Best of Shawn Colvin (2010)
 Playlist: The Very Best of Shawn Colvin (2012)

Live albums
 Live '88 (1995)
 Live (2009)
Live from These Four Walls: My Favorite Movie Songs (2021)
 Lockdown: Live from Arlyn Studios (2021)

DVDs
 Music in High Places – Live in Bora Bora (2002)
 Polaroids: A Video Collection (2004)

References

External links

1956 births
American women singer-songwriters
American folk singers
Fast Folk artists
Grammy Award winners
Living people
Musicians from London, Ontario
People from Vermillion, South Dakota
Musicians from Austin, Texas
People from Carbondale, Illinois
Singer-songwriters from Illinois
20th-century American women guitarists
20th-century American guitarists
21st-century American women guitarists
21st-century American guitarists
Singer-songwriters from Texas
Guitarists from Illinois
Guitarists from Texas
Guitarists from South Dakota
20th-century American women singers
21st-century American women singers
Columbia Records artists
Nonesuch Records artists
Fantasy Records artists
20th-century American singers
21st-century American singers
Singer-songwriters from South Dakota
Jazz musicians from South Dakota